Freedom From Fear: The American People in Depression and War, 1929–1945 is a Pulitzer Prize–winning book written in 1999 by the American historian David M. Kennedy.  It is part of the Oxford History of the United States.  The book covers America's coping with the Great Depression and World War II.

The book was awarded the 2000 Pulitzer Prize for History, the 2000 Francis Parkman Prize, the 2000 Ambassador Book Award, and the 2000 California Gold Medal for Literature.

References

External links
 
Presentation by Kennedy on Freedom from Fear, June 5, 1999, C-SPAN
Booknotes interview with Kennedy on Freedom from Fear, June 20, 1999, C-SPAN

1999 non-fiction books
American history books
Non-fiction books about the Great Depression
History books about World War II
20th-century history books
Oxford University Press books
Pulitzer Prize for History-winning works